Kazarian may refer to:
 Frankie Kazarian, American professional wrestler
 Paul Kazarian (born 1955), Armenian-American investor, financier, businessperson, and philanthropist
 Jerry Kazarian (born 1954), retired Armenian-American soccer forward who spent two seasons in the North American Soccer League
 Daniel Kazarian (1883–1958), a well-known composer, conductor, singer, teacher, he founded music studios in Leninakan and Batumi, authored a number of popular songs
 Andranik Kazarian (1904–1992), Major General, Soviet Union Hero (1943). During World War II he headed a regiment, a brigade, a division. Kazarian took part in the liberation of Kongsberg, was the representative of Soviet commandment in Manchuria.
 Sergei G. Kazarian, a professor and researcher in physical chemistry whose principal research interests are molecular spectroscopy of polymeric materials and supercritical fluids processing